Elitserien (literally, "the Elite League") is the name of several Swedish nationwide sport leagues. In many sports, Elitserien is the highest league, with the second highest named Allsvenskan.

Elitserien leagues at present:
 Elitserien (badminton)
 Elitserien (bandy)
 Elitserien (baseball)
 Elitserien (chess)
 Elitserien (men's curling)
 Elitserien (women's curling)
 Elitserien (orienteering)
 Elitserien (men's rugby union)
 Elitserien (women's rugby union)
 Elitserien (speedway)
 Elitserien (tennis)
 Elitserien (men's volleyball)
 Elitserien (women's volleyball)
 Elitserien (water polo)

Leagues formerly named Elitserien:
 Elitserien (1927–35), the highest ice hockey league 1927–1935
 Swedish Hockey League, the highest ice hockey league, named Elitserien 1975–2013
 Swedish Super League (men's floorball), the highest men's floorball league, named Elitserien 1995–2007
 Swedish Super League (women's floorball), the highest women's floorball league, named Elitserien 1997–2012
 Elitserien (men's basketball), the highest men's basketball league 1954–1992, now Basketligan
 Elitserien (women's basketball), the highest women's basketball league 1957–2001, now Basketligan dam
 Elitserien (women's bandy)
 Elitserien (men's table tennis)
 Elitserien (women's table tennis)
 Handbollsligan, called Elitserien between 1990-2016
 Svensk handbollselit, called Elitserien between 1989-2016

See also